Thrincophora archboldi is a moth of the  family Tortricidae. It is found in New Guinea.

References

Moths described in 1952
Archipini